Fox Sports Tennessee (FSTN) was an American regional sports network owned by Diamond Sports Group, a joint venture between Sinclair Broadcast Group and Entertainment Studios, and operateed as an affiliate of Fox Sports Networks. The channel broadcast regional coverage of professional and collegiate sports events in the state of Tennessee, namely the Memphis Grizzlies and Nashville Predators.

Fox Sports Tennessee was available on cable providers throughout Tennessee, eastern Arkansas and southern Kentucky, with an estimated reach of 1.8 million subscribers, and nationwide on satellite via DirecTV and Dish Network.

The network closed down on March 31, 2021. Its content was merged into the schedules of the newly named Bally Sports South and Bally Sports Southeast.

History

Fox Sports Tennessee launched on October 31, 2008, and was created through the separation of Fox Sports South into three regional networks: alongside the main Fox Sports South channel (originating from Atlanta, Georgia) and Fox Sports Carolinas, the latter of which launch on the same date as Fox Sports Tennessee. In July 2013, News Corporation spun off the Fox Sports Networks and most of its other U.S. entertainment properties into 21st Century Fox.

On December 14, 2017, as part of a merger between both companies, The Walt Disney Company announced plans to acquire all 22 regional Fox Sports networks from 21st Century Fox, including Fox Sports Tennessee. However, on June 27, 2018, the Justice Department ordered their divestment under antitrust grounds, citing Disney's ownership of ESPN. On May 3, 2019, Sinclair Broadcast Group and Entertainment Studios (through their joint venture, Diamond Holdings) bought Fox Sports Networks from The Walt Disney Company for $10.6 billion. The deal closed on August 22, 2019.

In 2020, Diamond Sports formed a partnership with Bally's Corporation was formed to rebrand the networks as "Bally Sports". On January 27, 2021, Bally's and Sinclair issued a joint press release unveiling the new logos for the rebrand of the networks that will occur at a still undetermined date later in 2021. It also was announced that Fox Sports Tennessee would be shut down at that time with programming being merged into the new Bally Sports South (previously Fox Sports South) and Bally Sports Southeast (previously Fox Sports Southeast). The final event broadcast by the network was a 3-2 Predators win in overtime against the Dallas Stars on March 30, 2021.

Programming
Fox Sports Tennessee held the regional cable television rights to the Memphis Grizzlies of the NBA and the Nashville Predators of the NHL. It also carried simulcasts of Major League Baseball games, carrying Cincinnati Reds games televised by Fox Sports Ohio, St. Louis Cardinals games televised by Fox Sports Midwest and (within Tennessee) Atlanta Braves games televised by Fox Sports South, as well as coverage of collegiate sports events from the Southeastern Conference.

Other services

Fox Sports Tennessee HD
Fox Sports Tennessee HD was a high definition simulcast feed of Fox Sports Tennessee, which broadcasts in the 720p format. The channel broadcasts most Predators and Grizzlies games (both live telecasts and late night replays) as well as several NCAA football and basketball games shown nationally on FSN and other programming distributed nationally by Fox Sports Networks in high definition. Fox Sports Tennessee HD originally transmitted only during game telecasts (with a test pattern being shown at other times) until July 2009, when it was converted into a 24-hour simulcast feed.

Announcers

Memphis Grizzlies
 Pete Pranica – play by play announcer
 Brevin Knight – analyst
 Rob Fischer - sideline reporter / Grizzlies LIVE host
 Chris Vernon - Grizzlies LIVE analyst / contributor

Nashville Predators
 Willy Daunic - play-by-play announcer
 Chris Mason - analyst
 Kara Hammer - rinkside reporter
 Terry Crisp - Predators LIVE analyst 
 Lyndsay Rowley - Predators LIVE host/reporter
 Jerome Jurenovich and Kelsey Wingert – Preds Studio Update Host

References

External links

 

Fox Sports Networks
Television channels and stations established in 2008
2008 establishments in Tennessee
Television channels and stations disestablished in 2021
2021 disestablishments in Tennessee
Defunct mass media in Tennessee
Former subsidiaries of The Walt Disney Company